The U.S. Post Office-Stuttgart is a historic post office building at 302 South Maple Street in Stuttgart, Arkansas.  Built in 1931, this single-story Colonial Revival brick and limestone structure was the first purpose-built post office building in the city.  A 1966 addition sensitively matched the existing building materials.  The building was used by the U.S. Postal Service until 2002, and was purchased by the city, which converted it for use as city offices.

The building was listed on the National Register of Historic Places in 2004.

See also
National Register of Historic Places listings in Arkansas County, Arkansas

References

Post office buildings on the National Register of Historic Places in Arkansas
Colonial Revival architecture in Arkansas
Government buildings completed in 1931
National Register of Historic Places in Arkansas County, Arkansas
Stuttgart, Arkansas
1931 establishments in Arkansas